Colonel Henry Cornewall (c. 1654 – 22 February 1717) was an English soldier, courtier and Member of Parliament.

Early life
He was born the eldest son of Edward Cornewall of Moccas Court and Frances ( Pye) Vaughan, daughter of Sir Walter Pye and the widow of Henry Vaughan of Moccas Court and Bredwardine. From his mother's first marriage, he had an elder half-brother, Roger Vaughan, a courtier and MP for Hereford. He succeeded his father in 1709.

Career
In 1685 he raised a regiment of foot, which later became the 9th (East Norfolk) Regiment of Foot. He resigned this command following the Glorious Revolution, as he personally opposed William III of England taking the throne. He was replaced by Colonel John Cunningham who led the regiment to Ireland to try and relieve the Siege of Derry. In the House of Commons, he represented Weobley from 1685 to 1689, Hereford from 1689 to 1695, Herefordshire from 1698 to 1701 and Weobley again in 1701, from 1702 to 1708, and from 1710 to 1713.

Personal life
He married twice. Firstly to Margarita Laurentia Huyssen of Middelburg in Zeeland, the wealthy heiress of Laurentius Huyssen Lord of Welden, whom he married on 11 October 1683. The couple had two children.

 Henry Cornewall (1685–1756), General
 William Henry Cornewall (died 1688, aged four months)

Margarita died on 26 April 1692 and was buried at the Dutch Church, Austin Friars. Henry's second wife was Susanna, the daughter and coheir of Sir John Williams, whom he married on 27 April 1695. The couple had three children:

 Velters Cornewall (1697–1768), MP for Herefordshire
 James Cornewall (1698–1744), Captain in the Royal Navy, killed at the Battle of Toulon
 Mary Cornewall (d. 1741), married to Hon. Henry Berkeley

Cornewall died on 22 February 1717, and was buried six days later in the South aisle of Westminster Abbey. He left his Radnor estates to his eldest son and property in Herefordshire (Moccas Hall and Bredwardine) to Velters.

References

1650s births
1717 deaths
English MPs 1685–1687
English MPs 1689–1690
English MPs 1690–1695
English MPs 1695–1698
English MPs 1698–1700
English MPs 1701
English MPs 1702–1705
English MPs 1705–1707
Members of the Parliament of Great Britain for English constituencies
British MPs 1707–1708
British MPs 1710–1713
Burials at Westminster Abbey
Royal Norfolk Regiment officers